Swathi  is a town in Parasi District in the Lumbini Zone of southern Nepal. At the time of the 2011 Nepal census it had a population of 10629 people living in 2102 individual households. This VDC is combined with Sunwal VDC to make Sunwal Municipality.

References

Populated places in Parasi District